Petar Pjesivac, is a Serbian-Montenegrin writer (of Serbian descent), most notably winning the "Golden Owl” award for the third best unpublished novel of the year in 2013.

Biography

Petar Pjesivac graduated from Flinders University's Medical School in 1989. Prior to his graduation at the Flinders University, he was studying medicine in USSR (3rd Moscow's Medical Institute "Imeni Semahko” (Nikolai Semashko)) Russia (U.S.S.R), and at the Belgrade University- Serbia (Yugoslavia). Dr. Pjesivac is a qualified medical practitioner currently practicing in Melbourne – Victoria - Australia.

Upon his birth in Adelaide his parents, Anna and Jovan, moved to Montenegro (Yugoslavia) in 1963. He grew up in Zabljak, Belgrade and Moscow and returned to Australia in 1987.

His early prose writings were inspired by the NATO bombardment of Yugoslavia in 1999 and were first published in Toronto – Canada (1999 – Z. Acin, Magazin za kulturu – "Pogledi").

His first novel "Z" was published by Stylos Publishing – Novi Sad (The edition of Matica srpska) in 2003. Since then Pjesivac published novels "Tri dvojine – Nara" (Putokazi-Beograd 2009 ) and his most acclaimed literary work  (Little Nemo – Pančevo) in 2011. His novel "Priručnik za rušenje" was a contender for the prestigious NIN literary award NIN Prize in 2012.

Petar Pjesivac was a regular contributor and columnist for the World Serbian Voice(Australian edition). He was a contributor for the literary magazine " Sveske " Pančevo.

Petar Pjesivac is an active member of The Association of Writers of Serbia (Udruzenje Knijževnika Srbije) since 2011.

His novel "Povratak Ž-a" (Return of the Z) published by "Zavod za izdavanje udžbenika Republike Srpske was awarded with the prestigious third prize "Zlatna sova" (Golden Awl) for the best unpublished novel in 2013.

He was a contender for the prestigious NIN literary award NIN Prize with several of his novels (2011 , 2013 ).

His latest novel  ("When the war is over") was published in September 2018 by a renowned Serbian publishing house "AGORA".
Parents: Anna and Jovanovic Pješivac

Works

2003 Stylos Novi Sad, Matica srpska.
2009  Putokazi, Beograd
2011 Mali Nemo, Pančevo
2013 Narodna i univerzitetska biblioteka Republike Srpske, Banja luka
2015 Ind Media Publishing
2018 AGORA 2018 ( Novi Sad: Sajnos )

References

External links
 Official web site of Petar Pjesivac

1962 births
Living people
Australian people of Serbian descent
People from Adelaide
Flinders University alumni
University of Belgrade Faculty of Medicine alumni